is a Japanese company, manufacturing print media supplies, publishing products, stationery products, non-woven fabric products, special embossed products, foils, films, and paper products. The company is listed on the Tokyo Stock Exchange.

The company's headquarters are located in Kyoto and Tokyo. Dynic was founded in 1919 as Nippon Cloth Industry Co., Ltd. in Kyoto. In 1948 Tokyo office was opened. In 1974 it changed its name to Dynic Corporation.

The company expanded overseas over the years and now has subsidiaries in Taiwan, Singapore, Hong Kong, the United States, Thailand, the UK and China.

In Japan the company has factories in Taga, Shiga, Fukaya, Saitama, Kita, Tokyo, Fuji, Shizuoka and in Mooka, Tochigi.

References

External links
 Official website 
 Official website 

Manufacturing companies established in 1919
Companies listed on the Tokyo Stock Exchange
Manufacturing companies based in Kyoto
Office supply companies of Japan
Japanese brands
Japanese companies established in 1919